John Wallace Pierre from the University of Wyoming, Laramie, WY was named Fellow of the Institute of Electrical and Electronics Engineers (IEEE) in 2013 for development of signal processing methods for estimation of power-system stability.

References

Fellow Members of the IEEE
Living people
Year of birth missing (living people)
Place of birth missing (living people)
University of Wyoming faculty
American electrical engineers